Isobutyramide in chemistry is an amide with the molecular formula C4H9NO.

Isobutyramide can also refer to the functional group with the following chemical formula: R-NH-CO-CH(CH3)2.

See also 
 Butyramide

Carboxamides